The Pearl of Cleopatra (Italian:Le perle di Cleopatra) is a 1922 Italian silent film directed by Guido Brignone and starring Carlo Aldini.

Cast
 Carlo Aldini 
 Liliana Ardea 
 Giuseppe Brignone 
 Vasco Creti 
 Cesare Gani Carini
 Fernanda Negri Pouget 
 Armand Pouget 
 Lola Visconti-Brignone

References

Bibliography
 James Robert Parish & Kingsley Canham. Film Directors Guide: Western Europe. Scarecrow Press, 1976.

External links

1922 films
1920s Italian-language films
Films directed by Guido Brignone
Italian silent feature films
Italian black-and-white films